James David Reninger (March 7, 1915 – August 23, 1993) was a Major League Baseball pitcher who played in  and  with the Philadelphia Athletics. He batted and threw right-handed.

External links

1915 births
1993 deaths
Major League Baseball pitchers
Baseball players from Illinois
Philadelphia Athletics players
People from North Fort Myers, Florida
Sportspeople from Aurora, Illinois